Lyons Garage is a building in Grand Forks, North Dakota that was built in 1929 and was listed on the National Register of Historic Places in 1982. The rectangular building was built as an expansion of an adjacent Lyons Auto Supply company building that had been built in 1912. The 1912 building is not included in the National Register listing.

The Lyons Garage is one of two "outstanding" buildings, both one story and both "done in polychrome brick of yellow and red", that "represent the Tudor Revival", within the Downtown Grand Forks area whose historic resources were surveyed in 1981; the Northern Pacific Depot and Freight House is the other.

There has been reported paranormal activity in the building, including the apparition of small man in overalls carrying an old oil can.

Property demolished in March 2022.

References

External links
Finding Aid to the Norene Roberts Papers, including notes on Lyons Garage, at North Dakota State University

Commercial buildings on the National Register of Historic Places in North Dakota
Commercial buildings completed in 1929
Tudor Revival architecture in North Dakota
Automobile repair shops
National Register of Historic Places in Grand Forks, North Dakota
1929 establishments in North Dakota
Buildings and structures demolished in 2022
Demolished buildings and structures in North Dakota